This list of intellectual freedom awards is an index to articles about notable awards celebrating intellectual freedom, specifically freedoms of thought, speech, and  expression; this includes press and academic freedom.  General human rights awards are not included, unless their primary focus is on intellectual freedom.  The list is organized by the country of the sponsor of the award, but awards are not necessarily limited to people from that country.

Journalism awards

General awards

Ironic / Anti-Awards
These awards celebrate intellectual freedom by calling attention to those who harm it. 
 Muzzle Awards, by the Thomas Jefferson Center for the Protection of Freedom of Expression

See also

 Lists of awards
 List of human rights awards

References

Intellectual freedom